Showtime is a video recording by British rock band Blur, released in February 1995. Directed and edited by Matthew Longfellow and produced by Ceri Levy, the film is a recording of the band's gig at Alexandra Palace, London, England on 7 October 1994. For many years, the video has only been released in the UK on VHS. A cult following to get it released on DVD occurred amongst fans, which became successful as a DVD version is included on Blur 21 boxset, released 30 July 2012.

Track listing
 "Lot 105"
 "Sunday Sunday"
 "Jubilee"
 "Tracy Jacks"
 "Magic America"
 "End of a Century"
 "Popscene"
 "Trouble in the Message Centre"
 "She's So High"
 "Chemical World"
 "Badhead"
 "There's No Other Way"
 "To the End"
 "Advert"
 "Supa Shoppa"
 "Mr. Robinson's Quango"
 "Parklife"
 "Girls & Boys"
 "Bank Holiday"
 "This Is a Low"

References

Blur (band) albums
1995 video albums